Borino is a village in the municipality of Kruševo, North Macedonia.

Demographics
In the late Ottoman period, Borino was exclusively populated by Muslim Albanians.

In statistics gathered by Vasil Kanchov in 1900, the village of Borino was inhabited by 200 Muslim Albanians. 

According to the 2021 census, the village had a total of 385 inhabitants. Ethnic groups in the village include:

Albanians 313
Bosniaks 47
Turks 13
Others 12

References

External links

Villages in Kruševo Municipality
Albanian communities in North Macedonia